The class WDS-5 is a diesel-electric locomotive used by Indian Railways for shunting and doing departmental works. The model name stands for broad gauge (W), Diesel (D), Shunting  (S) engine. The WDS-6 is used all over India.

History
The class was imported in 1967 to address the need for powerful shunting locomotive that will be able to haul 20-24 coach rakes. The previous WDS-4 class was underpowered for this kind of operation. They were manufactured by BLW varanasi using the kits provided by ALCO. The WDS-5 can easily be recognized by their shot nose and flat-ended cab at one end. Some were sold and transferred to industrial concerns and public sectors, but have IR road numbers on them.

Locomotive sheds

See also

 Rail transport in India#History
 Locomotives of India
 Rail transport in India
Indian locomotive class WDS-6

Bibliography

References

S-5
Co-Co locomotives
ALCO locomotives
Railway locomotives introduced in 1967
5 ft 6 in gauge locomotives